Rhodes School District 84.5 is a school district headquartered in River Grove, Illinois. It has a single K-8 school: Rhodes School.

Debra Suhadja served as principal of the school from 2006 until she retired in 2015.

References

External links
 Rhodes School District 84.5
School districts in Cook County, Illinois